Ghosts of Versailles may refer to

The Ghosts of Versailles, a 1983 opera by John Corigliano and William M. Hoffman
Moberly–Jourdain incident or Ghosts of Versailles, a 1901 claim of time travel and hauntings
Miss Morison's Ghosts, a 1981 British supernatural television drama based on the Moberly-Joudain incident

See also
Versailles (disambiguation)